Trelawney or Trelawny was a ship launched at Bristol in 1781. Initially she was a West Indiaman. In 1791 she made one voyage as a slave ship in the triangular trade in enslaved people. She then made one voyage as a whaler in the British southern whale fishery. She was sold to Liverpool and then made two more voyages as an enslaving ship. She was damaged outbound on a fourth enslaving voyage and then disappears from online records.

Career
Trelawny first appeared in Lloyd's Register (LR) in 1781.

Captain William Sherry acquired a letter of marque on 11 September 1782.

1st enslaving voyage (1791–1792): Michael Crangle was initially listed as her captain. Trelawney, sailed from Bristol on 28 July 1791, bound for West Africa. Trelawney, King, master acquired captives at Bonny and arrived at Montego Bay, Jamaica on 28 April 1792. She had embarked 333 slaves and she arrived with 313, for a 6% loss rate. She had left Bristol with 35 crew members and had arrived at Jamaica with 30. She discharged eight crew while at Montego Bay, and enlisted three shortly before sailing. She sailed for England on 20 May and arrived back at Bristol on 21 July with 25 crew members.

Whaling voyage (1793–1796): Captain Robert Hillman (or Hilman) sailed from Bristol in 1793, bound for Peru. Trelawney was recorded as visiting Saint Helena in 1794. In July 1795 Trelawney was at Valparaiso, and on the coast of Peru on December 1795 with 170 tons of sperm oil. She arrived back at Bristol on 16 December 1796. 

Trelawney disappeared from Lloyd's Register between 1798 and 1800, with her data to 1798 not having been changed from that of 1793. She may have been sold and have assumed another name as she does not appear in Lloyd's Lists ship arrival and departure data for 1797 and 1798, though there is no obvious candidate in Lloyd's Register for 1798. At some point she apparently was sold to Liverpool. 

2nd enslaving voyage (1799–1800): Captain James Lake acquired a letter of marque on 23 October 1798. He sailed from Liverpool on 29 October; he started acquiring captives in June 1799 at Malembo. 

In the morning of 2 August the 85 captives aboard Trelawney rose up against their captors. They wounded two sailors; the rest escaped in the boats and made their way to another ship, which was anchored nearby. Lake and his crew left Trelawney in the rebels' hands. Captain Kendall of Lord Nelson started firing on Trelawney and sent his men to retake her. The men from Lord Nelson succeeded in subduing the uprising. Kendall then went aboard Trelawney, forcing Lake and his crew to come with him. In 1802 Kendall sued Trelawneys owners for salvage. The judge of the High Court of Admiralty awarded the plaintiff 10% of the estimated value of Trelawney, her cargo, and freight, approximately £10,000, plus the salvor's expenses. The award was less than would be awarded by application of the Prize Act, as the judge ruled that under the circumstances the two vessels had a duty of mutual assistance.

Trelawney arrived at Kingston, Jamaica on 21 February 1800 with 190 captives. She left for England on 29 May. Lake died on 31 May. Trelawney, late Lake, arrived back at Liverpool on 15 July. Captain John Towns Powell had replaced Lake. She had left Liverpool with 41 crew members and had suffered 10 crew deaths on her voyage.

The Trelawney of this article returned to Lloyd's Register in the issue for 1800. She also appeared in the Register of Shipping (RS), which first published in 1800.

3rd enslaving voyage (1800–1801): Captain Thomas Smith acquired a letter of marque on 28 August 1800. He sailed from Liverpool on 6 October 1800. He acquired captives at Calabar. Trelawney, Smith, master, arrived at Kingston, Jamaica on 27 April 1801 with 318 captives. She had left Liverpool with 46 crew members and he arrived with 40. Smith died on 19 June 1801.

Trelawney sailed from Kingston on 25 June and arrived back at Liverpool on 10 September, under the command of Captain Eglinton Richardson. She had suffered eight crew member deaths since first leaving Liverpool.

4th enslaving voyage (1802): Captain Andrew Roberts sailed from Liverpool on 17 June 1802.  Trelawney capsized in the River Mersey at Liverpool on 20 June as she was coming out of the dock. She was bound for an African port. Lloyd's List reported that the Trelawney that had got onshore at Liverpool had been gotten off and put into dock.

Fate
By one account, Trelawney, Moon, master, was wrecked in December 1806 on the Ness Sands, in the Bristol Channel, with the loss of her captain. She was on a voyage from Bristol to Jamaica. A falling mast killed the captain; eleven crew members drowned.

However, this appears to have been . The Trelawney of the present article is no longer in Lloyd's Register or the Register of Shipping for 1804.

Notes

Citations

References
 
 
 
 
 

1781 ships
Ships built in Bristol
Age of Sail merchant ships of England
Bristol slave ships
slave rebellions
Maritime incidents involving slave ships
Whaling ships
Liverpool slave ships